North Port may refer to a number of places or things:

Beigang Island, Hainan, China
North Port, Florida, United States of America
North Port Distillery, in Angus, Scotland
North Port Oval, a cricket stadium in Port Melbourne, Australia
North Port light rail station, Melbourne, Australia

See also
Northport (disambiguation)